Annie Moses Band is a family of Nashville-based musicians and creators who have founded multiple artistic enterprises over a career spanning decades. Composed of seven classically-trained siblings and their veteran songwriter parents, the Wolaver family has produced 18 albums, 6 live DVDs, including 2 PBS specials, 9 musicals for children, 2 Broadway musicals, numerous music videos, and produced the television show, The Wonderful World of Benjamin Cello. As the Annie Moses Band, they have performed across the United States, Europe, and Asia and in venues such as Carnegie Hall and The Grand Ole Opry.

History 
The Annie Moses Band signed with Provident Sony in 2008 and subsequently released This Glorious Christmas, which hit the Top Ten on Billboard Magazine's Classical Crossover chart.  The following year, the band released a PBS special, Christmas With The Annie Moses Band which garnered over 1,200 hours of airtime, setting the record for a debut artist.  In 2012, Annie Moses Band made their debut at Carnegie Hall and the Grand Ole Opry.  Their subsequent album, Pilgrims & Prodigals, ranked No. 11 on the Billboard Bluegrass Albums chart and peaked at No. 6 on Billboard's Heatseekers - Northeast chart.

Discography 
 2005 - Eden, ManAlive Records
 2006 - Bethlehem, House of Bread, ManAlive Records
 2006 - Always Morning Somewhere, Manalive Records
 2007 - Through the Looking Glass, ManAlive Records
 2007 - Christmas Bright & Beautiful, ManAlive Records
 2008 - This Glorious Christmas, Sony BMG/ManAlive Records
 2009 - Christmas with the Annie Moses Band, ManAlive Records/Dream Journey
 2012 - Pilgrims & Prodigals, ManAlive Records
 2013 - Christmas Loves Company, ManAlive Records
 2014 - Best of the Beginning, ManAlive Records
 2015 - American Rhapsody, Warner Classics
 2016 - The Art of the Love Song, Warner Classics/Rhino
 2017 - This Glorious Christmas Deluxe - ManAlive Records
 2018 - O Holy Night - ManAlive Records
 2021 - Tales From My Grandpa's Pulpit - Gaither Music

References 

Musical groups from Nashville, Tennessee